Annamalai University is a public state university in Chidambaram, Tamil Nadu, India. The  sprawling campus offers courses of higher education in arts, science, engineering, medical, management, humanities, agriculture, and physical education. The university also provides more than 500 courses through distance education. With over 32,480 students residing on campus, it is one of the largest unitary, teaching, and residential universities in Asia, and is among the most reputed and ranked universities in India including the rankings from NIRF, QS World University Rankings, Times University Rankings, CWTS Leiden Ranking, India Today Magazine.

The National Assessment and Accreditation Council has conferred accreditation to the university in the fourth cycle, and subsequently with its highest A+ grade in 2022. Annamalai University is also recognized among the 18 universities in India having the 'Centre with Potential for Excellence in Particular Area (CPEPA)' with a focus on drug development and climate change.Established in 1929, it is one of the oldest and among the most prestigious universities in India. The university was also ranked as 18th most influential institution in India and It is also among the topmost google searched universities in India as well as in the World.

Annamalai University is a member of the Association of Indian Universities (AIU) and The Association of Commonwealth Universities  (ACU). All the degrees awarded by Annamalai University are mutually recognized by all Indian Universities and Foreign Universities under the commonwealth fold.

The university is also a permanent member of AMDISA (Association of Management Development Institutions in South Asia) that provides the SAQS Accreditation (South Asian Quality System) to the Institutions.

History

The university was founded in 1929 by the entrepreneur Rajah Sir S. Rm. M. Annamalai Chettiar in the aftermath of the Montagu–Chelmsford Reforms. In the early 1920s, to serve the downtrodden and to promote Tamil literature, Rajah Sir S. R. M. Annamalai Chettiar founded Sri Minakshi College, Sri Minakshi Tamil College and Sri Minakshi Sanskrit College in a rural setup at Chidambaram. In 1928, Rajah Sir S. R. M. Annamalai Chettiar agreed with the local government to hand over the above said institution for establishing a university. Thus, on 1 January 1929 Annamalai University was established as per Annamalai University Act 1928 (Tamil Nadu Act 1 of 1929). The most significant development is the enactment of the Annamalai University Act, 2013 (Tamil Nadu Act 20 of 2013), which came into force from September 25, 2013, after obtaining the assent of the president of India.

Faculties 
The university has ten faculties, namely agriculture, arts (including management studies), dentistry, education, engineering and technology, fine arts, Indian languages, marine sciences, Rajah Muthiah Medical College (medicine, de-affiliated in 2021) and science.

Organization and administration

Governance

The organizational structure of Annamalai University consists of the Senate, the Syndicate, the Academic Council, the faculties, the Finance Committee, and the Boards of studies. The governor of Tamil Nadu is the chancellor of the university. The vice-chancellor is the executive head of the university. The registrar of the university, who is the secretary of the Syndicate, is the custodian of all the records and chief administrator of the university. The examinations of the university is managed by Office of the Controller of Examinations.

Schools and departments

Annamalai University is one of the largest unitary, teaching, and residential Universities in Southern Asia consisting of 10 faculties and 49 departments of study. This university has played a pivotal role in providing access to higher education to thousands of youths cutting across the social spectrum, especially from economically and socially disadvantaged classes. In this respect, this university's service to the Nation is tremendous. Annamalai University is organized into ten main schools, each of which comprises multiple departments and centres as below.

Faculty of Arts 

English, History, Political Science and Public Administration, Economics, Commerce, Sociology and Social Work, Population Studies, Business Administration, Library and Information Science, Centre for Rural Development, Philosophy.

Faculty of Science

Department of Mathematics, Department of Statistics, Department of Physics, Department of Chemistry, Department of Botany, Department of Zoology, Department of Earth Sciences, Department of Biochemistry & Biotechnology, Department of Microbiology, Department of Computer and Information Science.

Faculty of Marine Sciences

Centre of Advanced Study (CAS)

Faculty of Indian Languages

Department of Tamil Studies Research, Hindi, Sanskrit, Center of Advanced Studies in Linguistics.

Faculty of Engineering & Technology

Computer Science and Engineering (Artificial Intelligence and Machine Learning), Computer Science and Engineering (Data Science), Chemical Engineering, Civil Engineering, Civil and Structural Engineering,  Computer Science and Engineering, Electrical and Electronics Engineering, Electronics and Communication Engineering, Electronics and Instrumentation Engineering, Information Technology, Mechanical Engineering, Mechanical Engineering (Manufacturing).

Faculty of Education

Faculty of Fine Arts
Nagaswaram, Thavil, Miruthangam , Flute, Bharathanaatiyam , Nattuvangam, Vocal, Thevaram

Faculty of Agriculture

Agronomy, Soil Science and Agricultural Chemistry, Genetics and Plant Breeding, Microbiology, Plant Pathology, Entomology, Agricultural Economics, Horticulture, Animal Husbandry, Agricultural Extension.

Faculty of Medicine

Anatomy, Physiology, Biochemistry, Pharmacology, Pathology, Microbiology, Forensic Medicine, Community Medicine, Medicine, Surgery, Obstetrics & Gynaecology, Pediatrics, TB & Chest Disease, Dermatology Venereology and Leprosy, Orthopaedics, Otorhinolaryngology, Psychiatry, Radiology, Physical Medicine & Rehabilitation, Anaesthesiology, Neuro Surgery, Urology, Plastic Surgery, Nursing, Emergency Medicine.

Faculty of Dentistry

Periodontology, Orthodontics and Dentofacial Orthopaedics, Oral & Maxillofacial Pathology, Pedodontics and Preventive Dentistry, Oral Medicine & Radiology, Public Health Dentistry, Prosthodontics and Crown & Bridge, Conservative Dentistry & Endodontics, Microbiology, Anatomy, Pharmacology, Physiology, Biochemistry, Oral & Maxillofacial Surgery.

Affiliated colleges 
In July 2021 Higher Education Minister of Tamil Nadu Mr K. Ponmudy announced to change the status of Annamalai University from unitary to affiliating university. The university have colleges affiliated to it from four districts, namely Cuddalore, Kallakurichi  Mayiladuthurai and Villupuram. In his recent announcement 14 more colleges of Mayiladuthurai district merged with Annamalai University which was earlier affiliated with Bharathidasan University.

Controversies 
In March 2022, the UGC warned students against enrolling for any online and distance learning courses offered by the university as it did not have the requisite recognition to do so from the UGC.

According to University Vice-Chancellor Mr. RM Kathiresan the degrees were offered as per the Madras High Court direction as the university is having a stay order to the UGC's direction imposing jurisdictional restriction is still valid. And all the hearings and proceedings were in the favour of our varsity. So Unless the UGC's gets that stay vacated the degree distance programmes are valid. He further added that a National Assessment and Accreditation Council review team visited the campus between March 16 and 18. As the results are expected anytime, we will go for distance education board approval and get it done. The problem will be sorted out soon.

Mr. R Singaravel, director of distance education at the university, said the students degree will not become invalid with the UGC notice. As we are the oldest and most prestigious university under Government of Tamil Nadu and offering our programmes before the existence of UGC and IGNOU.

UGC's circular that distance education courses at Annamalai University are not valid is incorrect. Contempt of court. The High Court issued a restraining order in our favor in 2018 in favor of the UGC Circular on the grounds that it was in our favor in relation to our university jurisdiction. The UGC reissued a similar circular while the injunction was in force. Subject to contempt of court. Students studying at our university actually have no legal issues. Their courses are legally valid.

University officials also stated that Annamalai University Act 1929 was signed and approved by both the then governor general of the British government and the governor general of the central government.  The Annamalai University Act 2013 was approved by both the governor and the president of the state. Therefore, the jurisdiction of the Annamalai University. The same applies to the whole of India as it does to the central universities. Other state university laws are not like that. One approved by the governors of the State.

And Annamalai University remote drive is something that appeared long before the emergence of Delhi IGNOU University. Distance Education as DEC. Something that appeared even before the Council appeared and announced the protocols.

Academics

Accreditation
The National Assessment and Accreditation Council accredited Annamalai University with a grade of "A+" in 2022. The Faculty of Agriculture of Annamalai University is accredited with ICAR (NAEAB).

Rankings

The Annamalai University was ranked 1001+ in the world by the Times Higher Education World University Rankings of 2020 and 351–400 in Asia. It was ranked in the 151-200 band overall in India by the National Institutional Ranking Framework (NIRF) for 2020 and in the 151-200 band among universities. NIRF also ranked it 12 in its pharmacy ranking in 2020.

On 6 August 2022 Annamalai University was ranked 15th in India overall among government universities by the magazine India Today.

Distance education 
The Directorate of Distance Education was established in 1979 and offers more than 500 courses, including MBAs. All study programmes offered are approved by the Distance Education Council. The B.Ed. programme is approved by the National Council for Teacher Education.

Annamalai University opened its first international office in Toronto, Canada, in 2006, named Annamalai Canada. As it does not have degree-granting authority in the province of Ontario, it acts as a recruitment office for international students for programs and courses in Tamil language, literature, arts, yoga and dance. It offers bachelor's, master's and Ph.D. degrees awarded by Annamalai University's main campus.

Annamalai University is India's first and oldest university to offer distance education programmes after receiving assent from the central government.

Scholarships and awards

A total of 356 scholarships and awards are given to eligible candidates every year.

Notable alumni
 

 P. C. Alexander, Indian Administrative Service officer, former Governor of Tamil Nadu and Governor of Maharashtra
 K. Anbazhagan, former Finance Minister of Tamil Nadu, MLA (Park Town constituency) and General Secretary of DMK
 Subbiah Arunachalam
 C. Sylendra Babu, renowned Indian Police Service officer of Tamil Nadu cadre
 K. Balachander, Indian director, producer, writer, actor, playwright, stage conductor, and comedian who worked mainly in the Tamil film industry; graduated in Zoology
 Bala V. Balachandran, founder and Dean, Great Lakes Institute of Management, Chennai, India
 K. Balakrishnan (CPI-M), politician 
 R. K. Baliga, father of the Electronic City in Bangalore, India
 T. K. Doraiswamy, poet and novelist
 Ere. Elamvazhuthi, MLA for Cuddalore constituency of Tamil Nadu from 1967 to 1970 representing Dravida Munnetra Kazhagam (DMK)
 Kulandei Francis, activist, social worker, recipient of the Magsaysay Award in 2012
 R Gandhi, retired deputy governor of the Reserve Bank of India
 A. S. Gnanasambandan, Tamil writer, scholar and literary critic from Tamil Nadu, India
 Kovai Gnani, writer and Marxist thinker
 Ravi Gomatam, quantum physicist, director of Bhaktivedanta Institute and Institute for Semantic Information Sciences and Technology, Berkeley, and Mumbai
 Vijay Govindarajan, best-selling author, Coxe Distinguished Professor at Tuck School at Dartmouth 
Justice V. R. Krishna Iyer judge, presidential candidate, Minister for Law and Irrigation Kerala
 Narayanaswamy Jayaraman, organic chemist and Shanti Swarup Bhatnagar laureate
 D. R. Karthikeyan, Indian Police Service officer from Tamil Nadu
 G. Nammalvar, agriculturist, scientist
 V. Narayanasamy, politician, Former Chief Minister of Puducherry
 K. A. Mathiazhagan, senate member of this university, Minister of Tamil Nadu and speaker of Tamil Nadu legislative assembly.
 Vennira Aadai Moorthy, Tamil comedy actor
 N. S. Satya Murthy – physicist, Shanti Swarup Bhatnagar laureate
 G. Balakrish Nair, Indian microbiologist
 K. S. Narayanaswamy, Carnatic veena exponent of the Thanjavur style
 Nedumaran, Tamil politician from the state of Tamil Nadu, South India
 V. R. Nedunchezhiyan, former chief minister of Tamil Nadu
 K. Ponmudy, Minister Of Higher Education 
 Vijaya T. Rajendar, Tamil actor, singer, director and politician
 Panruti S. Ramachandran
 Sujatha Ramdorai, professor of mathematics and Canada Research Chair at University of British Columbia
 Savitha Reddy, dubbing artist in the southern India film industry
 V. Sethuraman, dermatologist and actor
 V. T. Sambanthan, fifth president of Malaysian Indian Congress and one of the founding fathers of Malaysia
 E. V. Sampathkumaran, condensed matter physicist, Shanti Swarup Bhatnagar laureate
 Narayanasami Sathyamurthy, scientist
 Pakkiriswamy Chandra Sekharan, forensic expert and Padma Bhushan recipient
 S. S. Sivasankar, Minister of Tamilnadu Transportation,Former Minister of Minorities MLA (Kunnam (State Assembly Constituency))
 S. D. Somasundaram, former cabinet minister
 S. Srinivasan, aerospace scientist and Padma Bhushan recipient
 Vijayalakshmy Subramaniam, Carnatic music vocalist
 M. Swaraj, MLA Kerala
 Ramanuja Vijayaraghavan, Indian physicist, Shanti Swarup Bhatnagar laureate (1976), UGC Raman Award (1983)

See also 
List of educational institutions in Tamil Nadu

References

External links

 

 
Universities in Tamil Nadu
Education in Cuddalore district
Educational institutions established in 1929
1929 establishments in India
Agricultural universities and colleges in India
Agriculture in Tamil Nadu